Coprosma ochracea, the Maui mirrorplant, is a shrub that is native to Hawaii.

A member of the coffee family, it bears bright red or orange berries.

The Hawaiian thrush eats its fruits and spread the seeds. Some people use the berries as laxative.

References

ochracea
Endemic flora of Hawaii
Biota of Hawaii (island)
Flora without expected TNC conservation status